Dean Silvers is an American film producer,  film director, screenwriter, attorney and author.

Personal life
Dean Silvers was born in Brooklyn, New York and currently resides in Manhattan, New York with his wife, Marlen Hecht, and their two sons, Forrest Silvers and Tyler Silvers.

Career 
He produced Flirting with Disaster, Manny & Lo, and Spanking the Monkey, which won the Audience Award at the Sundance Film Festival and two Independent Spirit Awards.

The New York Times "Bookshelf" column wrote that Silvers' book, Secrets of Breaking into the Film and TV Business (William Morrow and Company/HarperCollins), is "brimming with helpful hints".

Filmography
 Unconquered (1989) (co-producer) (CBS Broadcasting Inc. (CBS))
 Resident Alien (1990) (co-producer) (Docurama)
 The Last Good Time (1994) (producer) (The Samuel Goldwyn Company)
 Spanking the Monkey (1994) (producer) (Fine Line Features)
 Wigstock: The Movie (1995) (producer) (The Samuel Goldwyn Company)
 Manny & Lo (1996) (producer) (Sony Pictures Classics)
 Flirting with Disaster (1996) (producer) (Miramax Films)
 Split Screen (1997–2001) (executive producer) (Independent Film Channel (IFC))
 Warriors of the French Foreign Legion (2000) (executive producer) (Discovery Channel)
 Committed (2000) (producer) (Miramax Films)
 Border Patrol: Life on the Line (2001) (executive producer) (Discovery Channel)
 The Atlantis Conspiracy (2001) (director, writer, and producer) (Home Box Office (HBO) and Zweites Deutsches Fernsehen (ZDF))
 The Investigators (TruTV series) (2002–2004) (executive producer) (TruTV)
 Dor I' Dor: Honoring the Generations (2008) (producer and writer) (Weizmann Institute of Science)
 Beyond the Fire (2009) (executive producer) 
 One Fall (2011) (producer) (Paladin Film)
 Sela (2013) (producer and writer) (Weizmann Institute of Science)
 Becoming Jiff (2018) (executive producer) (Samuel Goldwyn Films)

Bibliography
 Secrets of Breaking into the Film and TV Business (2014) (William Morrow and Company/HarperCollins)

References

External links

American film producers
American film directors
American lawyers
Independent Spirit Award winners
Living people
American male non-fiction writers
21st-century American non-fiction writers
Year of birth missing (living people)
21st-century American screenwriters
21st-century American male writers